Anna Guzik (born 1976 in Katowice, Poland) is a Polish actress.

She is the winner of the 6th edition of Dancing With The Stars.

Filmography
 1999: Krugerandy
 2002: Król przedmieścia
 2003: Bao-Bab, czyli zielono mi
 2003: Ciało
 2005: Klinika samotnych serc
 2005–present: Na Wspólnej
 2006: Wędrowiec
 2006-2008: Hela w opałach
 2007: Benek
 2008: Magiczne drzewo
 2008: Expecting love
 2008: Agentki
 2022: No Means No

Entertainment
 2006 - Kuba Wojewódzki (talk-show) - with Weronika Rosati
 2007 - Szymon Majewski Show - with Bohdan Łazuka
 2007 - Dzień Kangura - with Zbigniew Buczkowski
 2007 - Taniec z Gwiazdami - in pair with Łukasz Czarnecki
 2007 - Studio Złote Tarasy - hospitably in interview with Łukasz Czarnecki
 2007- You Can Dance - Po prostu tańcz - with Adam Fidusiewicz in finale of 1st edition
 2007 - Po prostu taniec - with partner Rafał "Roofi" Kamiński
 2008 - Się kręci - with Michał Lesień, Krzysztof Respondek and Piotr Wereśniak
 2008 - in 4th edition of  Jak Oni Śpiewają was guest of Artur Chamski
 2009 - alleZIMA! - hospitably on a ski slope in Szczawnica
 2009 - Taniec z Gwiazdami - hospitably with Agata Kulesza
 2010 - alleZIMA! - hospitably with team from Na Wspólnej
 2010 - Kocham Cię Polsko! - with Urszula Dudziak and Jan Mela

References

External links
Wikiquote: Anna Guzik (pl)
 (en)
Anna Guzik on side www.filmpolski.pl (pl)

1976 births
Living people
Polish actresses
Dancing with the Stars winners
People from Bielsko-Biała